The Century Plaza is a shopping mall in Birmingham, Alabama.

Century Plaza may also refer to:

 The Century Plaza Towers in Los Angeles
 The Century Plaza Hotel in Los Angeles
 Century Mall in Merrillville, Indiana 
 The Century Plaza South Tower, the former name of the Suzhou Zhongnan Center in Suzhou, Jiangsu, China